1 Pegasi (1 Peg) is a triple star system in the constellation Pegasus, located approximately 156 light years away from the Sun based on parallax. It is visible to the naked eye as a faint, orange-hued star with an apparent visual magnitude of 4.09. The system is moving closer to the Earth with a heliocentric radial velocity of −11 km/s.

The primary component is a giant with a stellar classification of K1III, a star that has exhausted the hydrogen supply at its core and evolved away from the main sequence. It has 1.57 times the mass of the Sun and has expanded to 12 times the Sun's radius. The star is radiating 72 times the Sun's luminosity from its enlarged photosphere at an effective temperature of 4,600 K.

There are several companions in addition to the primary. Visual companions C, with magnitude 12.9 and separation 64.7", and D, with magnitude 9.6 and separation 5.3", have been reported.

References

K-type giants
Pegasus (constellation)
BD+19 4691
Pegasi, 01
203504
105502
8173